The Appleby Frodingham Railway Preservation Society is based at Scunthorpe in North Lincolnshire. The society owns locomotives and rolling stock but not the railway it runs on. The name comes from the Appleby-Frodingham Steel Company, now known as British Steel Limited Scunthorpe after the companies buyout by Greybull Capital in 2016, and after going into compulsory liquidation in 2019, Jingye Group. The railway operates entirely within the Steelworks limits over tracks normally used for moving molten iron, steel and raw materials.

History
Occasional excursion trains were run around the Scunthorpe Steel Works site (such as in 1986) using the works' own locomotives. Then in 1990, steam-hauled passenger trains were run as part of a works anniversary celebration, using a locomotive borrowed from the Rutland Railway Museum. This was popular enough for further events to be planned using locomotive and carriages borrowed from the Keighley and Worth Valley Railway. The society now owns (or is responsible for) several steam and diesel locomotives. On occasions the internal steelworks (radio controlled) locomotives have been used on passenger trains.

Locomotives

Rolling Stock

Special Events
Irregular special events are organised such as 'Diesel Days' where Corus and other visiting locomotives operated a series of trains through the day. For example, in 2003 one of each type of internal steelworks locomotive: a Yorkshire Engine Company Janus, a Hunslet Anchor Locomotive and a 'High Line locomotive', together with an EWS Class 08 were used on the Gala trains, each making one round trip of around  using the societies Brake Vans and Class 108 DMU Carriages.

It is not unusual for the passenger trains to be stopped to allow steelworks trains to pass. It is sometimes possible to see trains carrying molten iron from the "Queens" - Blast Furnaces.

External links

Appleby Frodingham Railway Preservation Society website
British Steel Limited's Website

Heritage railways in Lincolnshire